Fernando Guerrero may refer to:

 Fernando Guerrero (Ecuadorian footballer) (born 1989), Ecuadorian footballer
 Fernando Guerrero (boxer) (born 1986), Dominican Republic boxer
 Fernando María Guerrero (1873–1929), Filipino politician, journalist, lawyer and polyglot
 Fernando Guerrero (Spanish footballer) (born 2001), Spanish footballer